Luxembourg has participated in the Eurovision Song Contest 37 times since making its debut at the first contest in . Luxembourg has not participated in the contest since its last participation in 1993. Luxembourg has won the contest five times.

After hosting the  contest, Luxembourg struggled to make an impact, only reaching the top ten twice, with Sherisse Laurence third and Lara Fabian fourth.

Participation overview 
Due to the country's small size and the national broadcaster's penchant for internal selection, most of Luxembourg's entrants came from outside the Grand Duchy, mainly from France. Solange Berry, Plastic Bertrand and Lara Fabian were from Belgium, Nana Mouskouri and Vicky Leandros from Greece, David Alexandre Winter and Margo from the Netherlands, Ireen Sheer and Malcolm Roberts from the United Kingdom, Geraldine from Ireland, Jürgen Marcus and Chris Roberts from Germany, Baccara from Spain, Jeane Manson, Maggie Parke and Diane Solomon from the United States and Sherisse Laurence from Canada. Of the five winners who represented Luxembourg, four were French and one was Greek.

Out of 38 entries in total, only the following nine entrants were native to Luxembourg: Camillo Felgen, Chris Baldo, Monique Melsen, Sophie Carle, Franck Olivier, Park Café, Sarah Bray, Marion Welter and Modern Times. Another singer native to Luxembourg, Mary Christy, represented Monaco in the 1976 contest, finishing in third place.

Congratulations: 50 Years of the Eurovision Song Contest

Hostings

Conductors

Commentators and spokespersons

Through the 37 years Luxembourg took part in the Eurovision Song Contest, the contest was broadcast on two channels (RTL TV and RTL Hei Elei), but the contest was mostly broadcast on the French section of RTL until it was divided in 1991 and after that it was broadcast in Luxembourgish. However, only one commentator, Maurice Molitor, was native to Luxembourg.

Photogallery

Notes and references

Notes

References

External links
Points to and from Luxembourg eurovisioncovers.co.uk

 
Countries in the Eurovision Song Contest
1958 in Luxembourg